Geranylgeranyl-diphosphate:isopentenyl-diphosphate transtransferase may refer to:
Geranylfarnesyl diphosphate synthase, enzyme
Hexaprenyl diphosphate synthase (geranylgeranyl-diphosphate specific), enzyme
All-trans-nonaprenyl diphosphate synthase (geranylgeranyl-diphosphate specific), enzyme